Polykrikos kofoidii is a species of phagotrophic marine pseudocolonial dinoflagellates that can capture and engulf other protist prey, including the toxic dinoflagellate, Alexandrium tamarense. P. kofoidii is of scientific interest due to its status as a predator of other dinoflagellates, a behavior that is significant in the control of algal blooms. It has a complex life cycle of both vegetative (asexual) and sexual reproduction complicated by its pseudocolonial structure.

References

Species described in 1914
Gymnodiniales